Heli is a Finnish and Estonian female given name.

It reached the peak of its popularity in the middle of the 20th century in Finland. As of December 2012, there are more than 17,000 people registered in Finland with this name.

Given name
 Heli Jantunen (born 1958), Finnish electrical engineer researching electroceramics for telecommunications
 Heli Järvinen (born 1963), Finnish politician 
 Heli Jukkola (born 1979), Finnish orienteering competitor
 Heli Koivula Kruger (born 1975), Finnish track & field athlete
 Heli Laaksonen (born 1972), Finnish writer, poet and performer
 Heli Lääts (1932–2018), Estonian singer
 Heli Rantanen (born 1970), Finnish javelin thrower
 Heli Simpson (born 1987), Australian actress and singer
 Heli Speek (born 1948), Estonian documentary filmmaker
 Heli Susi (1929–2020), Estonian teacher and translator

Surname
Peter Heli (born 1969), Estonian skier and floorball player

References

Finnish feminine given names
Estonian feminine given names
fr:Heli